Maurice Noel Ryder Purcell-FitzGerald (22 December 1835 – 17 December 1877) was an English cricketer.  Purcell-FitzGerald was a right-handed batsman.  The son of John Purcell-FitzGerald and Augusta Jane Lisle March Phillipps, he was born at Torquay, Devon.

Purcell-FitzGerald made a single first-class appearance for Sussex against Hampshire at Day's Antelope Ground, Southampton, in 1864.  In this match, he scored 8 runs in Sussex's first-innings, before being run out, while in their second-innings, he wasn't required to bat, with Sussex winning the match by 10 wickets.  Two years later, he made a second first-class appearance, this time for the Marylebone Cricket Club against Hampshire at Lord's.  Purcell-FitzGerald was dismissed for a duck by Sampson Tubb in the Marylebone Cricket Club's first-innings.  He wasn't required to bat again in the match, with the Marylebone Cricket Club winning by an innings and 58 runs.

Purcell-FitzGerald married Anne Laurie on 25 January 1860.  They had six children, three girls and three boys.  He was for many years a resident at The Crouch House in Seaford, Sussex, but died at Boulge Hall, Boulge, Suffolk, on 17 December 1877.  His uncle was the poet Edward FitzGerald.

See also
FitzGerald dynasty

References

External links
Maurice Purcell-FitzGerald at ESPNcricinfo
Maurice Purcell-FitzGerald at CricketArchive

1835 births
1877 deaths
Sportspeople from Torquay
English cricketers
Sussex cricketers
Marylebone Cricket Club cricketers
Maurice